Edward William Potts (July 12, 1881 – September 14, 1944) was a British gymnast who competed in the 1908 Summer Olympics and in the 1912 Summer Olympics. In the 1908 London Olympics he participated in the individual all-around competition and finished ninth.

At the 1912 Stockholm Olympics he was part of the British team which won the bronze medal in the gymnastics men's team, European system. He was the winner of the Individual Gymnastic Championship of England in 1912. Among other successes, he won the German Gymnastic Society (GGS) Open Championship in 1907, 1908 and 1909 and was a member of their winning international team in 1909. He was also winner of the Metropolitan and Southern Counties Amateur Gymnastic Association (MESCAGA) championship in 1910 and 1911.

References

1881 births
1944 deaths
British male artistic gymnasts
Gymnasts at the 1908 Summer Olympics
Gymnasts at the 1912 Summer Olympics
Olympic gymnasts of Great Britain
Olympic bronze medallists for Great Britain
Olympic medalists in gymnastics
Medalists at the 1912 Summer Olympics